Neochodaeus striatus is a species of sand-loving scarab beetle in the family Ochodaeidae. It is found in North America.

References

Further reading

 

scarabaeiformia
Articles created by Qbugbot
Beetles described in 1854